Lovejoy Glacier is a broad glacier descending eastward through the Usarp Mountains of Antarctica between Anderson Pyramid and the Sample Nunataks. In its lower course, the glacier runs side by side with the larger Harlin Glacier to the south without a ridge separating the two. It was mapped by the United States Geological Survey from surveys and U.S. Navy air photos, 1960–62, and was named by the Advisory Committee on Antarctic Names for Lieutenant Owen B. Lovejoy of U.S. Navy Squadron VX-6, a pilot of R4D aircraft in Antarctica, 1962–63 and 1963–64.

References

Glaciers of Pennell Coast